Bloody Sunday is the name given to a counter-revolutionary response to a leftist protest that occurred on February 16, 1969, in Istanbul's Beyazıt Square, Turkey. 

At eleven o'clock ten thousands of left-wing students supported by labor unions and the labor party started gathering in Beyazıt in order to protest against the dropping anchor of the American Sixth Fleet at the Bosporus. The route of demonstration began at the Beyazıt Square, went over Karaköy, Tophane and Gümüşsuyu where they paid tribute to death of the student Vedat Demircioğlu at the Istanbul Technical University. Meanwhile, right-wing students met at the Dolmabahçe Mosque for the suppression of the leftist protest and prayed before they moved on. The police, the official representative of the state, was already waiting at Taksim to both wings. Around four pm, finally, the clash occurred at the Taksim Square and turned the streets into a battlefield. Batons and knives were pulled, Molotov cocktails were hurled. The day resulted in the death of two leftist people and numerous injured.

Background 
A coup d'état in 1960 had allowed a group of Turkish military officers to take control of the country. Under this established government, labor tensions grew and anti-American sentiment rose. Elements of the Turkish left and labour movement were protesting against what they regarded as US imperialism.

Protests increased after the United States Sixth Fleet arrived in Turkey. Unrest peaked on February 16, 1969, when 30,000 people marched on Taksim Square. The demonstration was broken up by the police, but several thousand continued the march towards Taksim. It was at this point that a counter-revolutionary force attacked a large group of these protesters with knives and sticks. During this confrontation, two protesters, Ali Turgut and Duran Erdogan, were killed. Feroz Ahmad, a prominent Indian Turkey expert, refers to Bloody Sunday as "an example of organized, fascist violence", alluding to right wing elements responsible for most of the violence.

Left-right political tensions ran high for most of the 1960s and 1970s. Similar attacks on labor groups by right-wing elements in the government and Turkish politics occurred in 1971 and 1977. The 1977 massacre is referred to as Turkey's "second Bloody Sunday".

See also
 June 15-16 events (Turkey)
 Taksim Square Massacre

References 

1969 in Turkey
1969 riots
1969 protests
1960s in Istanbul
February 1969 events in Asia
February 1969 events in Europe
History of the Republic of Turkey
Human rights abuses in Turkey
Riots and civil disorder in Turkey
Political repression in Turkey
Protests in Turkey
1969 murders in Turkey